Partial integration may refer to:

 Integration by parts, a technique in mathematics;
 Partial integration (contract law), a situation that occurs when a contract contains only some of the terms to which the parties agree.